Duhallow is a barony located in the north-western part of County Cork, Ireland.

Legal context
Baronies were created after the Norman invasion of Ireland as divisions of counties and were used in the administration of justice and the raising of revenue. While baronies continue to be officially defined units, they have been administratively obsolete since 1898. However, they continue to be used in land registration and in specification, such as in planning permissions. In many cases, a barony corresponds to an earlier Gaelic túath which had submitted to the Crown.

Location and settlements 
It is located on the borders of counties Kerry and Limerick, and is bounded on the south by the Boggeragh Mountains. The Blackwater river flows southward from Ballydesmond to Rathmore before turning eastward past Millstreet, Kanturk and Banteer, eventually flowing to the sea at Youghal. The main towns in Duhallow are Newmarket, Kanturk and Millstreet, with smaller villages such as Ballydesmond, Banteer, Lyre, Kilcorney, Nadd, Ballydaly, Boherbue, Castlemagner, Cullen, Kiskeam, Kilbrin, Knocknagree, Lismire, Meelin, Freemount, Rockchapel, Tullylease and  Rathcoole.

Sport
Duhallow GAA is the local division for the Gaelic Athletic Association clubs of Duhallow. The top football and hurling competitions in the division are the Duhallow Junior A Football Championship and Duhallow Junior A Hurling Championship.

See also
 List of civil parishes of County Cork
 List of townlands of the barony of Duhallow in County Cork

Baronies of County Cork